The 1987 Green Bay Packers season was their 69th season overall and their 67th in the National Football League. The team finished with a 5–9–1 record under coach Forrest Gregg, earning them 3rd-place finish in the NFC Central division.

The 1987 NFL season was marked by a 24-day players strike, reducing the number of games from 16 games to 15. Three games of the Packers’ season were played with replacement players, going 2–1.

The season ended with coach Forrest Gregg announcing he was leaving to fill the head coaching position at his alma mater, Southern Methodist University.

Offseason

Draft

Personnel

Staff

NFL replacement players 
After the league decided to use replacement players during the NFLPA strike, the following team was assembled:

Roster

Regular season

Schedule 

Note: Intra-division opponents are in bold text.

Game summaries

Week 3

Standings

Statistical leaders

Awards and milestones

Hall of Famers 
 The following were inducted into the Green Bay Packers Hall of Fame in February 1987;
 Chester Marcol, K, 1972–80
 Deral Teteak, LB-G, 1952–56

References 

Green Bay Packers seasons
Green Bay Packers
Green Bay